Salukvadze is a Georgian surname. Notable people with the surname include:

Lasha Salukvadze (born 1981), Georgian football player
Nino Salukvadze (born 1969), Georgian sports shooter
Tamriko Salukvadze (born 1991), Georgian football player

Georgian-language surnames